Be What You Want To is the 1973 album by American guitarist Link Wray. The album was recorded in 1972 with many guest musicians, including Jerry Garcia, Commander Cody, and David Bromberg.

Track listing

All tracks by Link Wray except where noted.
"Be What You Want To" - 5:57
"All Cried Out"  (Mann Curtis, Michel Deborah) - 3:48
"Lawdy Miss Clawdy"  (Lloyd Price) - 2:41
"Tucson, Arizona" - 4:18
"Riverbend" - 2:40
"You Walked By" - 3:17
"Walk Easy, Walk Slow" - 5:20
"All the Love in My Life" - 4:05
"You Really Got a Hold on Me" - 4:04
"Shine the Light" - 4:43
"Morning" - 2:02

Personnel
Link Wray - electric guitar, lead vocals
Jerry Garcia - guitar, pedal steel
Commander Cody - piano, keyboards
Lance Dickerson - drums
Andy Stein - fiddle
Bobby Black - steel guitar
David Bromberg - acoustic guitar, electric guitar
Chris Michie - acoustic guitar, electric guitar, backing vocals
Tom Salisbury - organ, piano, Clavinet, backing vocals, horn arrangements, string arrangements
Peter Kaukonen - electric guitar
John McFee - electric guitar
Paul Barlow - bass
Teresa Adams - cello
Jules Broussard - alto saxophone, tenor saxophone
Jack Schroer - Baritone saxophone
Greg Douglass - slide guitar
Kip Maercklein - bass
Rick Shlosser - drums
Tom Harrell - trumpet
Jules Rowell - valve trombone
Nathan Rubin - violin
Bruce Steinberg - harmonica
David Coffin, Henry Coleman, Keith Crossan, Frank Demme, Diane Earl, Robert Frost, Zeller Hurd, Carl Johnson, Thomas Jefferson Kaye, Greg Kenney, Barbara Mauritz, Dorothy Morrison, Ralph Payne - backing vocals

Production
Producer: Thomas Jefferson Kaye
Recording Engineer: Mallory Earl, Don Ososke
Mixing: Mallory Earl
Photography: Bruce Steinberg
Art Direction: Bruce Steinberg
Cover Design: Bruce Steinberg

References

Link Wray albums
1973 albums
Polydor Records albums
albums recorded at Wally Heider Studios